Scituate High School is a public high school of Scituate, Massachusetts. The school is operated by Scituate Public Schools.

History
Scituate High School was founded in 1700 as Scituate Latin School. Their athletic teams competed in the Patriot League within MIAA Divisions 2, 3, and 4 (football only). In 1984 and 1985, two former students were selected in the NHL Entry Draft: John Devereaux by the Hartford Whalers in 1985 and Jamie Kelly by the Boston Bruins in 1985. The actor Peter Kastner taught at Scituate High during the 1990-1991 academic year.

Notable alumni
Claire Cook, writer
Casey Dienel, musician
Bruce Laird (1968), professional football player
Frank Craig Pandolfe (1976), United States Navy officer
Bill Tindall (1943), aerospace engineer
Anna Konkle, actor, writer

See also
List of high schools in Massachusetts

References

External links

Schools in Plymouth County, Massachusetts
Public high schools in Massachusetts
1700 establishments in Massachusetts
Educational institutions established in 1700
Scituate, Massachusetts